New Andalusia may refer to:
 Governorate of New Andalusia (1501–1513)
 Governorate of New Andalusia, in South America, created as one of the 1534 grants of Charles I of Spain
 New Andalusia Province, in South America, first colonized by Spaniards in 1569, led by explorer Diego Hernández de Serpa
 New Navarre, or New Andalucia Province (New Spain), created in 1565